Sandra Smisek (born 3 July 1977) is a former German footballer, who played as a striker in Germany for FSV Frankfurt, FCR Duisburg and FFC Frankfurt, as well as for the German national team.

Smisek has played for Germany at three Women's World Cup finals.

International career

Smisek made her debut for Germany on 13 April 1995 as a substitute for Patricia Brocker, also scoring her first goal in an 8–0 home victory against Poland. She was included in the 1995 FIFA Women's World Cup squad led by manager Gero Bisanz, her first major tournament, where she managed only one appearance, as a replacement for Maren Meinert in the 0–2 final defeat against Norway.

Smisek also represented Germany at the 1996 Summer Olympics, but never played once as Germany were eliminated in the group stage.

Under new manager Tina Theune, she established herself in the first team, playing in all of Germany's matches in the 1999 FIFA Women's World Cup until their 2–3 deficit against the United States in the quarter-finals, scoring against Mexico.

Smisek also appeared in the 2001 UEFA Women's Championship, where she scored against Russia, and Norway, to finish as joint top goalscorer with three goals alongside compatriot Claudia Müller, and help Germany to their fifth title.

International goals
Scores and results list Germany's goal tally first.

Career statistics

International

Honours
FSV Frankfurt
Bundesliga: Winner 1994–95, 1997–98
DFB-Pokal: Winner 1994–95, 1995–96
DFB-Hallenpokal: Winner 1994–95

FCR Duisburg
Bundesliga: Winner 1999–2000
DFB-Hallenpokal: Winner 1999–2000

FFC Frankfurt
Bundesliga: Winner 2006–07, 2007–08
DFB-Pokal: Winner 2006–07, 2007–08, 2010–11
DFB-Hallenpokal: Winner 2005–06, 2006–07
UEFA Women's Cup: Winner 2005–06, 2007–08

Germany
FIFA Women's World Cup: Winner 2003, 2007
UEFA Women's Championship: Winner 1997, 2001, 2005
Algarve Cup: Winner 2006
Nordic Cup: Winner 1995
Super Cup: Winner 1995

Individual
Bundesliga top goalscorer: 1995–96
UEFA Women's Championship top goalscorer (shared): 2001

References

1977 births
Living people
German women's footballers
Germany women's international footballers
1995 FIFA Women's World Cup players
1999 FIFA Women's World Cup players
2003 FIFA Women's World Cup players
2007 FIFA Women's World Cup players
Footballers at the 1996 Summer Olympics
Footballers at the 2008 Summer Olympics
Olympic footballers of Germany
Olympic bronze medalists for Germany
FCR 2001 Duisburg players
Footballers from Frankfurt
1. FFC Frankfurt players
FSV Frankfurt (women) players
FIFA Century Club
Olympic medalists in football
Medalists at the 2008 Summer Olympics
FIFA Women's World Cup-winning players
Women's association football midfielders
Women's association football forwards
UEFA Women's Championship-winning players